Alessandro Bichi (30 September 1596 – 25 May 1657) was an Italian Catholic Cardinal and papal nuncio to France.

Biography

Bichi was born in Siena in 1596, the son of Vincenzo Bichi and nephew of Cardinal Metello Bichi.
At an early age he became Lieutenant of the Auditor of the Apostolic Chamber during the pontificate of Pope Urban VIII and was then appointed Referendary of the Tribunals of the Apostolic Signatura of Justice and of Grace.

Bichi was elected Bishop of Isola on 5 May 1628) and was immediately sent to Naples as papal nuncio. 
In 1630 he became nuncio to France and on 9 September 1630 he was appointed Bishop of Carpentras. He was elevated to Cardinal in 1633 and was made Cardinal-Priest of Santa Sabina

In 1640 Alessadro Bichi made build by the Avignon architect François Royers de la Valfenière the new episcopal palace of Carpentras, which in 1801 became the Courthouse of the town.

In 1644, Pope Urban VIII died and the College of Cardinals came together in conclave to elected a new Pope. As nuncio to France, Bichi naturally sided with the Cardinals of the French delegation led by Antonio Barberini.

Bichi participated in the conclave of 1655 which elected Pope Alexander VII.  Bichi, who was already at odds with Innocent's powerful sister-in-law Olimpia Maidalchini, was said to have exclaimed, "We will elect a female pope".

He died on 25 May 1657 in Rome and he was buried in the Basilica di Santa Sabina..

Episcopal succession
While bishop, he was the principal consecrator of:
Jean de Sponde (bishop), Titular Bishop of Megara and Coadjutor Bishop of Pamiers (1634); 
Cristoforo Tolomei, Bishop of Sovana (1637);
Giovanni Spennazzi, Bishop of Pienza (1637); 
Francesco Romolo Mileti, Bishop of Segni (1640); and
Annibale Bentivoglio, Titular Archbishop of Thebae and Apostolic Nuncio to Florence (1645).

References

1596 births
1657 deaths
17th-century Italian cardinals
People from Siena
Cardinals created by Pope Urban VIII
Apostolic Nuncios to France
Apostolic Nuncios to the Kingdom of Naples